The 2018–19 EFL League One (referred to as the Sky Bet League One for sponsorship reasons) was the 15th season of the Football League One under its current title and the 26th season under its current league division format. Fixtures were released on 21 June 2018 and the opening round of matches was played on 4 August 2018. The league season ended on 4 May 2019.

The summer transfer window closed five days after the start of the season, on 9 August 2018, following a vote by all 72 clubs in the Football League. However, clubs were able to make loan signings until 31 August.

Team changes
The following teams have changed division since the 2017–18 season:

To League One

Promoted from League Two

 Accrington Stanley
 Luton Town
 Wycombe Wanderers
 Coventry City

Relegated from Championship
 Sunderland
 Burton Albion
 Barnsley

From League One
Promoted to Championship
 Wigan Athletic
 Blackburn Rovers
Rotherham United

Relegated to League Two
 Bury
 Milton Keynes Dons
 Northampton Town
 Oldham Athletic

Teams

reduced for that season as club work on ground

Personnel and sponsoring

 1 According to current revision of List of current Premier League and English Football League managers.

Managerial changes

League table

Play-offs

Results

Top scorers

Hat-tricks 

Note

(H) = Home; (A) = Away

References

 
EFL League One seasons
3
Eng

2018–19 English Football League